The Joe Burton Award was awarded annually to the Central Hockey League's (CHL) scoring champion. The award was named after the CHL's career point leader, Joe Burton, who accumulated 985 points in 11 seasons with the Oklahoma City Blazers. The award was named after Burton starting in the 2003–04 season.

List of winners

source: Central Hockey League Historical Award Winners

References

Specific

General 
Player point totals on the Internet Hockey Database
CHL Scoring Champion "Joe Burton Award" on Elite Prospects

Central Hockey League trophies and awards